Vaughan Springs may refer to:

 A location near Vaughan, Victoria, a village in Victoria, Australia
Vaughan Springs, also known as Pikilyi, a location in Northern Territory, Australia, on Mount Doreen Station pastoral lease